Victorio Gabriel Ramis (born 7 July 1994) is an Argentine professional footballer who plays as a forward for Alvarado in the Primera Nacional.

Career
Ramis' senior career began in 2014 with Talleres, who he joined in 2002. After being an unused sub for a Copa Argentina game with Chaco For Ever on 12 March, he made his professional debut in a goalless draw with Huracán on 26 May. One more appearance came in 2013–14, which was a season that ended in relegation to Torneo Federal A for Talleres. In Torneo Federal A, Ramis scored his first goal during a win over Defensores de Belgrano in November 2014. Six goals in twenty-one games occurred in two seasons in tier three. In their first season back in Primera B Nacional, Talleres won promotion to the Argentine Primera División.

After one season and twenty appearances with five goals in the Primera División, Ramis joined fellow top-flight team Godoy Cruz on 2 August 2017. His first appearance for Godoy Cruz arrived on 27 August versus Atlético Tucumán.

Career statistics
.

Honours
Talleres
Torneo Federal A: 2015
Primera B Nacional: 2016

References

External links

1994 births
Living people
Footballers from Córdoba, Argentina
Argentine footballers
Association football forwards
Primera Nacional players
Torneo Federal A players
Argentine Primera División players
Talleres de Córdoba footballers
Godoy Cruz Antonio Tomba footballers
Argentinos Juniors footballers
Ferro Carril Oeste footballers
Club Atlético Alvarado players